Ebrahim Beyglu (also Romanized as Ebrāhīm Beyglū) is a village in Minjavan-e Gharbi Rural District, Minjavan District, Khoda Afarin County, East Azerbaijan Province, Iran. At the 2006 census, its population was 73, in 14 families.

References 

Populated places in Khoda Afarin County